Stella March was pen name of Marjorie Bell Marshall (15 November 1915 – 1 August 2010) was a British writer of romance novels from 1956 to 1986. She was the fourth elected Chairman (1967–1969) of the Romantic Novelists' Association.

Bibliography

Novels
Just before the Dawn (1956)
Love Was the Reason (1957)
A Cloud in the Sky (1958)
For All but One (1959)
Because of Yesterday (1959)
Consultant in Love (1961)
Sing High, Sing Low (1961)
The Wrong Doctor (1962)
Love in the Air (1963)
Love Will Wait (1965)
Barrier to Love (1965)
Sentimental Journey (1966)
Out of the Shadows (1967)
The Flickering Flame (1968)
The Runaway Heiress (1980)
Carriage for Fiona (1981)
Dear Pretender (1981)
Song in Darkness (1982)
Silk for My Lady (1982)
Shadow of a Dream (1983)
To Myself a Stranger (1983)
The Mistress of Lamberley Grange (1984)
The Scent of Heather (1986)

References and sources

                   

1915 births
2010 deaths
English romantic fiction writers